Kensington Branch of the Philadelphia YWCA is a historic YWCA building located in the Hugh neighborhood of Philadelphia, Pennsylvania.  It was built in 1911 and expanded in 1916.  It is a six-story, brick with terracotta trim building in the Colonial Revival style.  The original three-story section was built as the Hoffman Memorial wing.

It was added to the National Register of Historic Places in 1990.

References

Buildings and structures on the National Register of Historic Places in Philadelphia
Colonial Revival architecture in Pennsylvania
Cultural infrastructure completed in 1916
1911 establishments in Pennsylvania